Kuznetsovo is a rural locality (a selo) in Kuznetsovsky Selsoviet of Magdagachinsky District, Amur Oblast, Russia. The population was 189 as of 2018. There are 4 streets.

Geography 
Kuznetsovo is located on the left bank of the Amur River, 160 km south of Magdagachi (the district's administrative centre) by road.

References 

Rural localities in Magdagachinsky District